Emily Quynh Nguyen (born July 19, 2002) is an American chess player and a Woman International Master.

Career 
Nguyen started playing chess competitively at a young age. Her early successes include winning the 2010 U.S. Junior Open (Open Under 8), the 2011 North American Youth Chess Championship (Girls Under 10), and the 2012 Pan-American Youth Chess Championship (Girls Under 12).

In 2016, she won the U.S. Junior Girls' Championship with a score of 6½/9, earning an invitation to the 2017 U.S. Women's Championship. She also won the 2016 North American Junior Girls' Championship, held in Dallas, Texas, with a score of 8/9, earning the FIDE title of Woman International Master. Nguyen competed in the U.S. Women's Chess Championship for the first time in 2017; she finished 12th out of 12, scoring 1 point out of 11. In 2019, she scored 2½/11, again finishing in 12th. In August 2019, at the age of 16, she became the second female ever to win the Denker Tournament of High School Champions after tying for first place with Bryce Tiglon and Ben Li. In 2020, Nguyen placed 7th at the U.S. Women's Chess Championship after scoring 5/11 points.

Nguyen currently attends Stanford University and is projected to graduate in 2024.

References

External links 
 
 
 
 

2002 births
Living people
American chess players
American female chess players
Chess Woman International Masters
21st-century American women